Van Horn Township is a township in Carroll County, in the U.S. state of Missouri.

Van Horn Township has the name of Robert T. Van Horn, a state legislator.

References

Townships in Missouri
Townships in Carroll County, Missouri